is a private junior college in Kanazawa, Ishikawa, Japan. Originally established in 1950 as a women's junior college, it became coeducational in 1998.

External links
 Official website 

Japanese junior colleges
Educational institutions established in 1950
Private universities and colleges in Japan
Universities and colleges in Ishikawa Prefecture
1950 establishments in Japan
Kanazawa